Mission Alliance - non-profit organization of Christian origin, engaged in development assistance. 

Historical background
Established in 1901. The organizers declared their foundations on the evangelical Christian faith in line with the Bible and the Apostolic Statement of Faith. In addition, the founders emphasized unity among all Christians. From early on, the focus of the organization has been on fighting poverty, often focussing on marginalized groups.

Current focus of operations
Mission Alliance focuses on diaconal mission and development projects among poor and marginalized people in ten countries across Latin America, Asia and Africa. The work is sponsored by individuals, companies and the government of Norway and focuses on areas including: Diaconal work through churches, leadership training, work in urban areas, education, microfinance, business development, health and rural development.

References

External links
Norwegian Mission Alliance Official Web-site
Norwegian Mission Alliance in Vietnam

Christian organizations established in 1901
Development charities based in Norway
Christian charities
Foreign charities operating in Vietnam